The South Pauwasi languages are a likely small language family of New Guinea, potentially consisting of Yetfa, Kimki, Lepki, Murkim and Kembra.

Classification
Usher (2020) classifies the languages as follows,
Yetfa – South Pauwasi River
Yetfa
South Pauwasi River
Kimki
Lepki–Murkim
Kembra
Lepki
Murkim

The relationship of the five languages was recognized in the early 2000s as Paul Whitehouse assembled unpublished data from the Summer Institute of Linguistics. Usher classifies them as a branch of the Pauwasi language family. Søren Wichmann (2013) agrees that Murkim and Lepki at least appear to be very closely related. Foley (2018) accepts that Kembra, which is very poorly attested, may be related as well.

Cognates
Some cognates connecting the languages are as follows. There are also loanwords in common with Pyu.

{| 
|+ South Pauwasi cognates
! gloss !! Yetfa !! Kimki !! Kembra !! Lepki !! Murkim
|-
| water || ket, kel || di || er || kɛl || kel
|-
| two || || || kais || kaisi || kais
|-
| head || || anok || || no-tɛl || anok
|-
| leaf ||  || bwaitʰ (?) || || -βai || bwaik
|-
| skin/bark || || it-'ba || || jit || jaitʰ
|-
| worm || || briɸ || || brɛp || breɸ
|-
| louse || (n)jim || -nim || nim || nɪm || ɪm
|-
| hair || || itʰ || -jet || jɛt || 
|-
| ear ||  || bwa ||  || bwi || bwi
|-
| eye || iː || ɛ̃ || ji || jɛ-mɔn ||
|-
| coconut || || was- || || wæjs || wais-
|-
| speech || ma || mi || || mi- || mi
|-
| knife || tema || tma || || tə̆'ma || tma
|-
| canoe || kuf || õːp || || kuβ || kuɸ
|-
| shit || ɲan || ain || || -ɲa || njah ~ iãh
|-
| person ||  || ap ~ aɸ || rá- || ra || ɸra
|-
| egg || nela || || -lĕl || dɛl || nel
|-
| fire/wood || jao (tree) || || já || ja ||  jo ~ ja-
|-
| house || nam || meː || || nim || mi
|-
| laugh || mamla || || || -mwel-o || mwalo
|-
| this || si || si || || || si
|-
| cloud || kos || || || kos- || kos-
|-
| tongue ||  || arbak || || braw || prouk
|-
| tail || || || nókwa || jouk || jakʷat~ɲakʷat
|-
| white || || lʊ || || dol- || lol
|-
| far || || uje~udʒe || || w̆ijɛ || wije~uje-
|-
| come || || -ki- || || guj- || kʷi
|-
| 1pl || || name || || || nakme
|-
| 2pl || || same || || || sakme-re
|}

References

External links
Timothy Usher, New Guinea World, proto–South Pauwasi River

 
Pauwasi languages